47th parallel may refer to:

47th parallel north, a circle of latitude in the Northern Hemisphere
47th parallel south, a circle of latitude in the Southern Hemisphere